Paolo Bailetti (born 15 July 1980) is an Italian professional road bicycle racer who last rode for the UCI Professional Continental team .

Major results 

2002
 1st  Under-23 National Road Race Championships
2003
 2nd Overall Girobio
2004
 1st Ruota d'Oro
2005
 2nd Trofeo Matteotti
 3rd Giro del Medio Brenta
 5th GP Nobili Rubinetterie
 7th Tre Valli Varesine
 8th GP Industria Artigianato e Commercio Carnaghese
2006
 9th Memorial Cimurri
2007
 4th Giro dell'Appennino
 4th Coppa Placci
 5th Overall Brixia Tour
 5th Trofeo Melinda
 8th Giro del Veneto
2008
 7th GP du Canton d'Argovie
2010
 5th Trofeo Matteotti
 6th GP du Canton d'Argovie
 7th Giro della Romagna
2011
 6th Memorial Marco Pantani
 6th National Road Race Championships
 8th Trofeo Melinda
 9th Overall Settimana Ciclistica Lombarda
 10th Giro della Toscana
2012
 1st  Mountains classification Giro della Provincia di Reggio Calabria
 5th Trofeo Matteotti
 8th Tre Valli Varesine

External links 

Italian male cyclists
1980 births
Living people
Cyclists from the Province of Varese
21st-century Italian people